Siôn ap Hywel (fl. c.1490-1532) was a Welsh language poet.

Siôn composed poems on themes of love and religion.  He is noted for his elegy on the death of Tudur Aled.

References
A. Cynfael Lake (ed.), Gwaith Siôn ap Hywel ap Llywelyn Fychan (University of Wales Centre for Advanced Welsh and Celtic Studies, 1999).

Welsh-language poets
16th-century Welsh poets
16th-century male writers
Year of birth uncertain